Goria dance or Garia dance is a dance of the Tripuri people of the Indian state of Tripura. It is performed during Goria puja, the festival to celebrate the sowing of new crops and prayer for a good harvest during the month of Baisakha.  In the western calendar, the dancing occurs after the middle of April.  As well as the Tripuri people themselves, the dance also occurs amongst neighbouring peoples of Tripuri such as the Jamatia, Reang and Noatia.  Both sexes take part in the dance accompanied by drums and flutes.  The dance begins with a slow rhythm, gradually increasing in tempo as the dance progresses from one village to another.  It involves many hand movements and some whirling.  The dancers also sing in chorus.  There are more than two-dozen mudra (movements) in the dance many of which represent the movements of animals and birds or other features of nature.

References

External links
  Includes lyrics and music audio.

Dances of Tripura